Victor Quintana (born 12 April 1976) is a retired Paraguayan football player, who played as a defensive midfielder.

Quintana started his career by playing for Club San Miguel de Misiones and then moved to Olimpia, where he won the 1998, 1999 and 2000 Paraguayan League. He then moved to FC Porto and returned on loan to Olimpia in 2002, year in which the club won the Copa Libertadores. The same year, he signed for Cruzeiro Esporte Clube and afterwards he played for a different number of clubs before retiring in 2008.

Between 1999 and 2003, he was summoned to play some games with the Paraguay national football team

Titles

References

External links
Profile at BDFA

Living people
1976 births
Paraguayan footballers
Club Olimpia footballers
Club Nacional footballers
Sportivo Luqueño players
FC Porto players
Cruzeiro Esporte Clube players
Expatriate footballers in Brazil
Moreirense F.C. players
Association football midfielders

Paraguayan expatriate sportspeople in Portugal